Marri   is a hill station in Rajanpur District, south Punjab, Pakistan. Its Altitude Is 4800 ft Cold Weather In Summer. Dragal mountain is an altitude of 5400 feet.

References

Populated places in Rajanpur District
Hill stations in Pakistan
Resorts in Pakistan
Tourist attractions in Punjab, Pakistan